Gallimaufry Performing Arts is a theater and dance company founded in 2004 in Laguna Beach, California by Steve Josephson, the current Executive Artistic Director.

Theatre
Gallimaufry was founded in 2004 by Steve Josephson. Since its inception, the company has produced 13 fully staged musicals, 5 plays, 11 dance events, 14 musical concerts and many other special events.

Scared Money
In April 2009, Gallimaufry presented the world premiere of a new play called Scared Money. The play was written by Sherwood Kiraly. Sherwood recently wrote the screenplay for the film Diminished Capacity, which starred Matthew Broderick and Alan Alda. His new play is a comedy about six people searching for hidden Santa Anita Pick Six Racetrack ticket worth $714,000. The title derives from an old saying "Scared money never wins", meaning that you shouldn't gamble money you're afraid to lose.

Dance

Dance Days
Dance days consist of free master classes followed by a free performance on Laguna's "Main Beach". Past master classes have ranged from rhythm tap, modern and hip-hop to Afro-Caribbean, Indian and Latin Jazz. Past dance day performances have included the inspirational and explosive Lula Washington Dance Theatre , Erin Landry, the "spirited grace" of Backhaus Dance , the "b-boying, poppin', lockin'" of JabbaWockeeZ, who became the first winners on the MTV series America's Best Dance Crew, the "choreographic intricacy and artistry" of Sean Greene, the premiere of Karama Adesco's ALIVE Contemporary Dance Company, San Francisco's "lively and sensuous" Company Chaddick , the contemporary drumming sounds of TAIKOPROJECT , the comic genius of Dudley Brooks' comedy dance troupe "Run for Your life" from San Francisco , the beguiling the evocative Indian choreography of Ramaa Bharadvaj & The Angahara Ensemble which also included a Tahitian ensemble .

Gallimaufry & Greene
Gallimaufry & Greene is the brainchild of Executive Artistic Director, Steve Josephson. Josephson, the creator of the company's "Dance Days" and "Songs in the Sand" series, as well as the executive director of the inaugural caDance Festival, has built this new company around famed dancer and choreographer, Sean Greene. The new contemporary dance company received its world premiere on April 18, 2007, as part of Gallimaufry's Arts Festival. The company has performed "The Rite to Fall", "Angels" and "A Night at the Movies", which they also took overseas to the Edinburgh Fringe Festival.

Jump Rhythm Jazz Project
In April 2008, Gallimaufry presented Jump Rhythm Jazz Project , the Emmy Award-winning dance company from Chicago. The group is made up of rhythmically explosive dancer-singer-actors that celebrate jazz. It was founded in 1990 by Billy Siegenfeld, who continues to choreograph for the company and perform as an ensemble member. He received a 2006-2007 Emmy Award in the category of Outstanding Achievement for Individual Excellence On Camera/Performer for his work in the multiple-Emmy Award-winning documentary Jump Rhythm Jazz Project: Getting There.

Pericles Redux
In October 2008, Gallimaufry brought a dance troupe straight from the Edinburgh Fringe Festival to perform on Main Beach. The troupe is called the 'Not Man Apart' Physical Theatre Ensemble, and the show was called Pericles Redux , a reconstruction of Shakespeare's romantic odyssey. The show pushed the boundaries between theatre and dance, and was met with rave reviews, both in Edinburgh and Laguna Beach.

Music

Ridiculous Medley
Created in 2006, The Ridiculous Medley is a new vocal performance group that performs for special events, community functions, parties, fundraisers and corporate events. Under the direction of Meredith Woodson-Hubbard, the Ridiculous Medley has already performed for the CHOC Queen of Hearts Guild  fundraiser as well as several community events.

Lagunatunes
Gallimaufry was affiliated with the Laguna Beach community choir called "Lagunatunes". The choir performs two concerts a year, one during the holiday season and one in early spring. These concerts are performed at the Artists' Theatre.

Arts Projects 
Gallimaufry is part of the Laguna Beach Alliance for the Arts.

The Generation GAP
The Generation GAP is a self-producing teen theatre company. The group focuses on learning all aspects of theatre, including producing, directing, performing, designing, managing, project managing and fundraising. Teens ages 12–18 plan, raise money, produce, design, cast, direct and perform in shows, and in the process learn all the ins and outs of how to run a theatre company. Generation GAP's most recent production was the musical "Little Women."

Edinburgh Fringe Festival

In the summer of 2007, Gallimaufry Performing Arts took two shows overseas to the Edinburgh Fringe Festival, the world's largest art's festival. Both shows performed in the renowned C venues. The group revived their production of Sordid Lives and a revamped version of Harlem Renaissance. Jonelle Allen received rave reviews for her performance as Florence Mills and the show was chosen as a "Pick of the Fringe" by The Gilded Balloon.
In 2008, the dance troupe Gallimaufry and Greene performed their show, "A Night at the Movies", at the Fringe.

Laguna Beach New Play Festival
In 2008, Gallimaufry joined with the Orange County Playwrights' Alliance  to conduct a playwright competition. They found both full-length and one-act plays that centered around Halloween. Eight plays were chosen and they were performed the first weekend of November at the Forum Theatre.

Songs in the Sand Series
Since 2006, Gallimaufry has been presenting concert versions of classic shows on the sands of Main Beach in Laguna. These concerts are free to the public and feature a full orchestra. The first in this series was South Pacific, followed by Carousel and Guys and Dolls. The most recent production was a series of songs from Fiddler on the Roof, My Fair Lady and Chicago.

The Arab, The Jew & The Chicken
In October 2008, Gallimaufry brought a Middle Eastern sketch comedy quartet to Laguna to perform their show. The show was entitled The Arab, The Jew & The Chicken. It was a hit at the 2008 Edinburgh Fringe Festival, and their performance in Laguna was their international debut. The show was written and performed by Arab, Israeli, Jewish and Muslim actors and it focused on conflict, identity and everyday life in the Middle East.

Archives

External links

 Gallimaufry Home Page 
 Review from the Fringe: Harlem Renaissance 
 Review from the Fringe: Harlem Renaissance 
 Review from the Fringe: Sordid Lives 
Article about Scared Money: Coastline 
Article about Scared Money: Laguna Independent 

Theatrical organizations in the United States
Dance companies in the United States
Performing arts education in the United States
Performing arts in California